Rafael Argullol Murgadas (Barcelona 1949) is a Spanish writer, philosopher, poet and professor of aesthetics at Pompeu Fabra University from Catalonia. The author of more than 30 books, he was granted the 1993 Nadal prize for his novel La razón del mal, the 2002 Fondo de Cultura Económica essay prize for Una educación sensorial, and the 2010 Cálamo prize and the Ciutat de Barcelona prize in the same year for his book Vision desde el fondo del mar.

References

External links
Rafael Argullol.com
Blog 
Vision of the Bottom of the Sea
Rafael Argullol at Xtec.es
Rafael Argullol at Pompeu Fabra University
El poder de la palabra

Philosophers from Catalonia
Writers from Catalonia
Spanish male writers
Academic staff of Pompeu Fabra University
Living people
Year of birth missing (living people)